Inhuman Condition is a Canadian web series created and written by R. J. Lackie, directed by Jared Pelletier, and starring Torri Higginson. The series premiered on the KindaTV YouTube channel on 4 July 2016. The series takes place in a world where the supernatural is an accepted part of life, and follows the story of a therapist who focuses on supernatural patients. The series was selected for funding the Independent Production Fund in 2014.

The first season consisted of 33 three-to-sixteen minute episodes, which streamed on KindaTV.

Plot

The series follows Dr. Michelle Kessler, a therapist who specializes in providing support to people with superhuman abilities, such as the anxious and vulnerable Tamar, whose mysterious and supernatural affliction lead her to accidentally murder 306 people as a child, and Clara, whose unique disease will eventually cause her to devolve into a zombie.

Episodes
The first season of Inhuman Condition consisted of 33 episodes.

Characters

Main 

 Dr. Michelle Kessler (played by Torri Higginson) is the protagonist of Inhuman Condition.
 Tamar (played by Cara Gee)
 Clara Walker (played by Clara Pasieka)
 Robert "Linc" Lincoln (played by Thomas Antony Olajide)

Recurring 
 William Bader (played by Shaun Benson)
 Graham (played by Robin Dunne)
 Mira (played by Niamh Wilson)
 Rachel (played by Angela Asher)
 Frank (played by Murray Urquhart)
 Cal Tulley (played by Wesley French)

Reception

The series has been called "a step forward for the medium" of web series by Bloody Disgusting, and drew praise from AfterEllen and others.

At the 5th Canadian Screen Awards, the series received a nomination under the Digital Media category for Best Original Program or Series, Fiction.

References

External links
Series page at YouTube

Official Twitter

2016 web series debuts
Canadian drama web series
Canadian LGBT-related web series
2010s Canadian LGBT-related drama television series
Bisexuality-related television series
Werewolf fiction
Zombie web series